Tii Paulo (born 13 January 1983) is a rugby union player for the Clermont in the Top 14 competition. He plays as a hooker.

Career
Paulo was educated at Kavanagh College, Dunedin, New Zealand. He played for the Crusaders in Super Rugby between 2005 and 2010 and has also played for the Canterbury and Tasman provincial sides. In 2010 he signed with Clermont. He is also part of Samoa's national team.

References

External links
Crusaders profile

1983 births
People educated at Trinity Catholic College, Dunedin
Living people
New Zealand sportspeople of Samoan descent
Rugby union players from Christchurch
Crusaders (rugby union) players
Canterbury rugby union players
Tasman rugby union players
ASM Clermont Auvergne players
Samoa international rugby union players
New Zealand rugby union players
Rugby union hookers
Expatriate rugby union players in France